CIBC Mellon was founded in 1996 as a joint venture between the Canadian Imperial Bank of Commerce (hereafter CIBC) and the Mellon Financial Corporation (now The Bank of New York Mellon) (hereafter Mellon) to offer asset servicing to institutional investors.  While commonly known as CIBC Mellon, the company comprises two sister companies, CIBC Mellon Trust Company and CIBC Mellon Global Securities Services Company (Compagnie Trust CIBC Mellon and Société de services de titres mondiaux CIBC Mellon in French respectively).  Based in Toronto, Ontario CIBC Mellon offers asset servicing to corporate and institutional clients.

On 16 February 2010, The Wall Street Journal reported that BNY Trust Co. of Canada would be acquiring the corporate trust assets of CIBC Mellon.

On 28 July 2010 it was reported that Pacific Equity Partners would acquire CIBC Mellon Trust Company's issuer services business (stock transfer and employee share purchase plan).

In 2016, the company expanded into Mississauga, adding 150 roles.

Offices

CIBC Mellon's head office is in Toronto at 1 York Street.   CIBC Mellon holds the lease from the fifth to tenth floor.

There are satellite offices in Canada:

 Calgary, Alberta - 6th floor Dome Tower
 Halifax, Nova Scotia 
 London, Ontario - 8th Floor, 255 Queens Ave.
 Mississauga, Ontario - 55 Standish Court, Suites 1200 and 1000
 Montreal, Quebec - Suite 650, 1 1001 de Maisonneuve Blvd. West
 Vancouver, British Columbia - Suite 1670 Oceanic Plaza (1066 West Hastings Street)

History

CIBC Mellon was founded in 1996 after CIBC joined with Mellon Financial Corporation in a 50-50 joint venture named CIBC Mellon Global Securities Services (CMGSS).  The following year, 1997, CIBC purchased a 50% stake in The R-M Trust Company from Mellon, which would become CMGSS's sister company, CIBC Mellon Trust Company (CMTC).  CIBC Mellon acquired the Pension and Institutional Trust businesses from Canada Trust in 1997 and the global custody business from the Bank of Montreal in 1999.  In 2002 CIBC Mellon acquired, from TD Financial Group, their third party investment fund custody business.

Pacific Corporate Trust Company

In 1998 it seemed that CIBC Mellon would be acquiring the Pacific Corporate Trust Company of Vancouver, British Columbia.  That deal eventually fell through, and it was subsequently acquired by Computershare Limited in 2005.

Felcom Data Services acquisition

On October 8, 2009, CIBC Mellon announced the acquisition of the unitholder recordkeeping and fund administration business of Felcom Data Services Inc., a wholly owned subsidiary of Jovian Capital Corporation, for a purchase price of approximately C$4.2 million.  CIBC Mellon indicated that they would offer employment to the majority of employees involved in the business lines acquired.

Sale of issuer services business to Canadian Stock Transfer Company, Inc.

On November 1, 2010, CIBC Mellon sold its issuer services business (stock transfer and employee share purchase plans) to Canadian Stock Transfer Company, Inc.

Structure

CIBC Mellon is a 50-50 joint venture between CIBC and BNY Mellon.  CIBC Mellon operates independently from both of its "owners".

While both CMTC and CMGSS physically occupy the same space, and in essence operate as one company, each has a separate board of directors which overlap the other.  The executive management team, however, has authority over both companies.

Leadership team

The current leadership team (as of 2022) comprises the following:

 Mal Cullen, president and chief executive officer
 Richard Anton, senior vice president and chief operations officer 
 Rob Ferguson, senior vice president, capital markets and shareholder relations
 Karen Rowe, chief financial officer
 Ash Tahbazian, chief client officer
Bill Graves, chief technology and data officer
 Paul Cunliffe, head of corporate communications and marketing
 Kelly Hastings, chief risk officer
 Tedford Mason, general counsel
Maple Tam, chief human resources officer
Catherine Thrasher, strategic client solutions and global risk solutions, CIBC Mellon and BNY Mellon

Past presidents and CEOs 

 Douglas Nowers, 1996–1998
 Thomas C. MacMillan, 1998–2009
 Thomas Monahan, 2009–2016
Steven Wolff, 2017-2022

Boards of directors

The current board of directors (as of 2018) comprises the following:

 Daniel Smith, chairman, CIBC Mellon boards of directors and executive vice president, head of Americas asset servicing, BNY Mellon

CIBC Mellon Global Securities Services Company

Anne-Marie Dunn, senior vice-president, talent acquisition and development, human resources, CIBC
John Ferren, senior vice-president and CFO, Canadian personal and small business banking, CIBC
Jeffrey Graham, partner, Borden Ladner Gervais LLP
Daniel Kramer, executive vice president, BNY Mellon Investment Services, and global head of client service delivery, BNY Mellon
Susan Rimmer, managing director and head, global corporate banking, CIBC World Markets Inc.
James Slater, executive vice president and global head of securities finance, BNY Mellon
Geoffrey Weiss, senior vice-president, deposits and product analytics, CIBC

CIBC Mellon Trust Company 
 Thaddeus Duchnowski, managing director, global client management, BNY Mellon
Anne-Marie Dunn, senior vice-president, talent acquisition and development, human resources, CIBC
John Ferren, senior vice-president and CFO, Canadian personal and small business banking, CIBC
David Gillespie, senior vice president of capital markets and wealth management operations, CIBC
Jeffrey Graham, partner, Borden Ladner Gervais LLP
Daniel Kramer, executive vice president, BNY Mellon Investment Services, and global head of client service delivery, BNY Mellon
Susan Rimmer, managing director and head, global corporate banking, CIBC World Markets Inc.
James Slater, executive vice president and global head of securities finance, BNY Mellon
Geoffrey Weiss, senior vice-president, deposits and product analytics, CIBC
Mal Cullen, president and CEO, CIBC Mellon

Chairmen 

 Richard E Venn, until 2009
 Thomas C. MacMillan, until 2012
Samir Pandiri, until 2018

Securities investigations

CIBC Mellon has been the subject of two securities investigations.  The first, in 1998, involved the now defunct Pay Pop Inc.  The second, in 2004, involved the disclosure of custodial information to an outside source.

Pay Pop Inc.

In 1998, Alnoor Jiwan, a manager in CIBC Mellon's Vancouver office, was approached by Pay Pop Inc. and asked whether CIBC Mellon could issue Pay Pop Inc. shares without the required disclaimer which stated that the securities were not registered with the SEC.

It was alleged by the SEC, in the subsequent investigation, that Mr Jiwan knew that the securities were not registered, but agreed to act as the transfer agent (in order to issue the stock certificates) in return for 820,000 Pay Pop shares.  The SEC subsequently cited CIBC Mellon for acting as an unregistered broker and transfer agent, and for offering to sell unregistered securities in addition to alleging that the company was uncooperative in the investigation.

Alnoor Jiwan was subsequently terminated for cause from CIBC Mellon, following the company's discovery of the transactions, and simultaneously ceasing all dealings with Pay Pop Inc.

CMTC agreed to pay a civil monetary penalty of US$5 million and disgorgement of $889,773 and prejudgment interest of $140,270.

CMTC was permanently enjoined from prescribed violations of Securities Act Section 5, Exchange Act Section 10(b) and Rule 10b-5, Exchange Act Section 15(a), Exchange Act Section 17A(c)(1), and from aiding and abetting future violations of Exchange Act Section 10(b) or Rule 10b-5.

Payment was made on March 4, 2005. CMTC also consented, without admitting or denying the SEC complaint's allegations, to the entry of an SEC administrative order based on the final judgment on March 2, 2005. Pursuant to the order, CMTC was censured and agreed to an undertaking to engage an independent consultant to review its relevant businesses and procedures.

Privacy breach

In 2004, a long-term employee of CIBC Mellon was terminated, after it had been discovered that they had been disclosing institutional holdings in certain companies to unidentified parties in return for gifts.  It was reported that the employee had received hockey and baseball tickets as well as up to $100 in cash for tips on big investors who owned specific stocks.

The disclosures were discovered when a temporary worker received a request for data through an email.  The subsequent investigation, which included reviewing phone and email records, discovered that the employee had been disclosing information for years.

Related party transactions with Enron

In 2003, CIBC paid out $80 million in charges for complicity with its involvement with Enron.  While the involvement was not related to CIBC Mellon, as CIBC is a majority stakeholder, it was required that it be reported on the TA-1 to the SEC.

References

Trust companies of Canada
Companies based in Toronto
Joint ventures
Canadian companies established in 1996
Canadian Imperial Bank of Commerce
Online brokerages